Chaerocina ellisoni is a moth of the family Sphingidae. It is known from the highlands of Ethiopia.

The length of the forewings is about 34 mm. The head and thorax are bright grass green with whitish edges. The abdomen is paler green. The forewings are bright grass green with a straight darker green postmedial line. The hindwings are paler green and the underside is green.

References

Endemic fauna of Ethiopia
Chaerocina
Moths described in 1963
Insects of Ethiopia
Moths of Africa